The Everett Hawks were a professional minor league arena football team based in Everett, Washington. The team was in existence for five years (2002–07) in three leagues, the Northwest Football League (NWFL), the National Indoor Football League (NIFL), and af2 and in two locations, the Eastside and Everett. They were first members of the Northwest Football League as the Eastside Hawks. After the 2004 season, they became a member of the NIFL as the Everett Hawks. In 2006 they switched to the af2. They played their home games at Everett Events Center.

On May 14, 2006, after losing their first six af2 games, Rickey Foggie was fired from the head coach position. The Hawks got their first win in af2 history by defeating the Stockton Lightning 41–40 on May 27, 2006. Nonetheless, soon after the end of the 2007 season, the team folded.

References

National Indoor Football League teams
Sports in Everett, Washington
Defunct af2 teams
2002 establishments in Washington (state)
2007 disestablishments in Washington (state)